RPM College, Patna also known as Rameshwardas Pannalal Mahila College is a degree college in Bihar, India. It is a constituent unit of Patliputra University. College offers Senior secondary education and Undergraduate degree in Arts, Science.

History 
College was established in 1970. It became a constituent unit of Patliputra University in 2018.

Degrees and courses 
College offers the following degrees and courses.

 Senior Secondary
 Intermediate of Arts
 Intermediate of Science
 Bachelor's degree
 Bachelor of Arts
 Bachelor of Science

References

External links 

 Official website of college
 Patliputra University website

Constituent colleges of Patliputra University
Educational institutions established in 1970
Universities and colleges in Patna
1970 establishments in Bihar